Oramiella is a genus of South Pacific funnel weavers containing the single species, Oramiella wisei. It was  first described by Raymond Robert Forster & C. L. Wilton in 1973, and has only been found in New Zealand.

References

External links

Agelenidae
Monotypic Araneomorphae genera
Spiders of New Zealand
Taxa named by Raymond Robert Forster